Udullu, Hajigabul may refer to:
Birinci Udullu, Azerbaijan
İkinci Udullu, Azerbaijan